3AW is a talkback radio station based in Melbourne, Australia, owned by parent company Nine Radio, a division of Nine Entertainment Co. It broadcasts on 693 kHz AM. It began transmission on 22 February 1932 as Melbourne's fifth commercial radio station.

History 
3AW was established when a company formed by Allans, JC Williamson's and David Syme (then publishers of The Age newspaper) was granted a radio broadcasting licence, with the first broadcast on 22 February 1932. The A in 3AW comes from the names of "Allans" and "The "Age"; and the W is from "J. C. Williamson". 3AW's first studio was situated in His Majesty's Theatre from whence it broadcast from 1932 to 1935.

3AW's original broadcast frequency was 1425 kHz and changed to 1280 kHz on 1 September 1935 as part of a national reshuffle of the radio broadcasting spectrum. On 23 November 1978 the station changed to 1278 kHz with the introduction of 9 kHz spacing on the AM band. Due to poor reception problems, at 7:15 a.m. on 1 May 2006, 3AW swapped with its sister station Magic to its present frequency of 693 kHz. The station's broadcast signal originates from a transmitter in Werribee.

A list of 3AW personalities can be found at - Category:3AW presenters.

◆ The present morning host, Neil Mitchell has filled a number of roles at the station over the last 35 years.

◆ Sunday night host Philip Brady has already notched up 34 years

◆ Darren James has hosted weekend morning programs for 34 years

◆ One of the current Breakfast presenters, Ross Stevenson has already been at the station for 32 years.

A number of people spent many years at 3AW in the past. Most of these are on the "3AW presenters" list (see above). They include:
 David McGee who spent 31 years at 3AW, 1955-1986 
 Geoff Manion's 29 years (1956–1985), 
 Martha Gardener who was at the station for 30 years, from 1952 to 1982
 Norman Banks, 28 years, 1952-1978 
 One of 3AW's announcers when the station commenced in 1932 was John Masters who presented a request program, Choice of the People for many years. 30 minute segments of Choice of the People were broadcast at various times throughout the day. A photo in the 1987 history of the station shows that he was a member of the original 1932 broadcasting staff; and then there is a website that highlights the fact that he was still broadcasting in 1951, 19 years later; memories from listeners (not substantiated) show that his career continued for over a decade after that 
 Peter James (father of Darren James) was with the station for at least 18 years (1959-1987), although some sources suggest that he was with the station for at least 20 years.  
 Harry Beitzel was a football commentator on 3AW for 17 years, from 1972 to 1989, and in 2005 he rejoined 3AW as a semi-regular contributor to Rex Hunt's pre-match show.

The 3AW studios are located at Media House, 655 Collins Street, Melbourne where it shares facilities with Magic 1278, the Australian Financial Review and The Age newspapers. After moving from their original studios at His Majesty's Theatre, the station was re-sited at 382 Latrobe Street, where it remained for most of the next 55 years. However, during renovations at 382 Latrobe Street, 3AW moved into the former premises of the ABC in Melbourne Place, a laneway off Russell Street, near Little Collins Street, which is now the premises of the Kelvin Club. Then, from 1991 until March 2010, the station broadcast from studios located at Bank Street, South Melbourne.

Technical innovations 
In April 2007, 3AW introduced cameras into their main studio so that fans, via the 3AW website, can watch the program being broadcast, as well as listen. The cameras do not operate during news services, commercial breaks, or outside broadcasts.

In August 2009, 3AW "went digital", offering a superior quality sound and other features, for those with digital receivers. Stations utilising the digital signal can also offer multi-channels and interactive features. The digital format used in Australia is DAB+, reportedly a superior technology to other digital formats.  the digital signal is not rebroadcast in road tunnels like the AM signal and does not have the distance range of AM.

In October 2011 (iPhone) and mid 2012 (Android), 3AW introduced an application (App) for smartphones or tablets. The application allows users to listen to the current program, read or listen to current news articles, get weather updates, contact the station via phone, email, Twitter or Facebook and also has an alarm clock feature.

3AW Football (AFL) 
3AW Football is the brand under which 3AW broadcasts Australian rules football and the station broadcasts football on all AFL match days.

3AW Football dates back to 1953, and legendary commentators such as Norman Banks and Harry Beitzel have spent time calling games at 3AW. Rex Hunt called football at 3AW for 21 years before moving to rival Triple M in 2010.

Matthew Lloyd and Dr Peter Larkins joined 3AW Football in 2012. The team for 2013 also had a number of changes,
Stephen Quartermain called on weekends, alongside either Tim Lane or Tony Leonard and the expert commentators. Cameron Ling has an expert commentary role interchangeably on Friday nights, Saturday afternoons and Sunday afternoons.

2014 saw the departure of Stephen Quartermain, and the recruitment of Nathan Brown as a ball-by-ball commentator for Saturday night and Sunday twilight matches.

Former 3AW Football team members 
(not a complete list)

 Norman Banks [one of the first 3AW commentators] (1953-1960s)
 Harry Beitzel (1972-1989)
 Bill Jacobs 
 Ian Johnson [one of the first 3AW commentators]
 Doug Heywood
 Mike Williamson
 Clinton Grybas (2000-2007)
 Rex Hunt (1989–2009)
 Dwayne Russell
 Cameron Ling (2012-2019)
 Andrew Bews
 Wayne Carey (2006-2007)
 Tony Charlton [one of the first 3AW commentators]
 Dennis Cometti (2008–2011)
 Scott Cummings
 Gerard Healy
 Craig Hutchison
 David King
 Garry Lyon
 Mick Malthouse (2012)
 Sam Newman (1981-1999)
 Brian Taylor (2010–2014)
 Stephen Quartermain (2013)
 Bill Vickers
 Robert Walls (1995–2012)

Cricket 
On 1 November 2013, 3AW's parent company, Fairfax Radio Network (FRN), announced that it had signed a five-year non-exclusive contract commencing with the 2013/2014 Australian cricket season, to broadcast the Boxing Day and Sydney Test matches, all One Day Internationals, the Big Bash League (BBL) and International T20 matches on network stations including 3AW. Subsequently, in December 2013, FRN decided on an earlier start to their coverage by including the Perth test match which commenced on 13 December 2013. Fairfax stated that "Fairfax Radio Network will bring to its coverage more than 60 years' experience of broadcasting sport, assembling a star-studded commentary line up". The coverage will provide a ball-by-ball commentary of all broadcast matches.

The commentary team is anchored by Tim Lane and Bruce Eva, together with a panel consisting of the following experts

 Ian Chappell
 Allan Border
 Dean Jones
 Damien Fleming
 Michael Vaughan
 Henry Blofeld
 Greg Matthews
 Greg Blewett
 Mickey Arthur
 Darren Lehmann
 Glenn McGrath
 John Emburey

Station ratings and market position 
In the sixth ratings survey for 2014, released 30 September 2014, 3AW came first with a 13.8% market share followed by ABC Radio Melbourne with 11.4% and Fox FM with 8.2%. In this survey 3AW won every timeslot.

In the fifth ratings survey for 2014, released 26 August 2014, 3AW came first with a 14% market share followed by ABC Radio Melbourne with 12% and Fox FM with 8.0%.

In the fourth survey, 3AW lost its No. 1 station rating, scoring a 13.0% market share against 774 ABC's 13.4% share with Gold 104.3 FM third on 7.4%.

In the first survey for 2014, released on 11 March 2014, 3AW was the No. 1 station scoring an 11.9% market share followed by ABC Radio Melbourne's 10.6% share with Fox FM third on 8.5%. This survey was also the first for new ratings supplier GfK Group, the company that has taken over the running of surveys from Nielsen ratings which produced the surveys for 66 years.

The final ratings survey for 2013 and the last to be conducted by Nielsen, saw 3AW complete five years as Melbourne's number one radio station with 40 consecutive survey wins.

Controversies 
In 1996, drive-time host Paul Barber was dismissed for telling listeners to boycott the Nine Network program, A Current Affair over the treatment of the Paxton family. He was dismissed after the Nine Network withdrew up to $300,000 in advertising.

In 1999, presenter Bruce Mansfield was sacked after it emerged that he had received benefits in exchange for giving favourable comments and interviews to companies on-air without proper prior disclosure. He returned to the station as its night-time presenter in 2001.

Former presenter Steve Price was tricked into accepting fake ecstasy tablets pressed with "3AW" from comedian John Safran as part of Safran's television show.

Elise Elliott (formerly known as Elise Mooney) was exposed on ABC TV's Media Watch for plagiarizing a story when a salaried editor. Journalistic eyebrows have been raised at her appointment by 3AW, and whether this issue was disclosed by her.

See also 
 3AW Breakfast
 Rumour File
 Radio Times
 List of radio stations in Australia

References

External links 
 3AW
 Article with 3AW/3EE Change-over photos and audio

Radio stations in Melbourne
News and talk radio stations in Australia
Radio stations established in 1932
Nine Radio
3AW presenters